Terebellum derives from a Latin word meaning 'borer' or 'auger', and may refer to:

 Terebellum (gastropod), a genus of sea snails in family Seraphsidae
 Terebellum (astronomy), a group of stars in the constellation Sagittarius
 ω Sagittarii, a star with the proper name Terebellum